Tactics (stylized as tactics) is a Japanese manga series written as a collaboration between Sakura Kinoshita and Kazuko Higashiyama. It was serialized in Comic Blade Masamune. Kinoshita supplied the character "Kantarou", and Higashiyama supplied the character "Haruka". While the manga was previously licensed for released in English in paperback by both ADV Manga and Tokyopop, the manga was only available in English in digital format on JManga for two years before it was no longer accessible.

The animation studio Studio Deen adapted the Tactics manga into a 25-episode anime series, which ran on Japanese television from October 5, 2004, to March 29, 2005. The English dub of the anime was distributed by Manga Entertainment in the United States, Canada and the United Kingdom.

Tactics resumed serialization on January 18, 2018, as tactics 新説 on pixiv comics.

Plot
Set in Japan during the Taishō period (in the anime, the manga is set during the late Meiji period), Tactics is the story of Kantarou Ichinomiya, a young man with the ability to see youkai and other mythical beasts. When he was a child, this ability resulted in him being ostracized by humans. His youkai friends told him that in order to be stronger, he must find the oni-eating tengu. The young Kantarou then vows to find it and name it. By naming one, a human becomes master and the name contract is only broken if the master chooses. As Kantarou grows up, he finds a career as a folklorist and a part-time exorcist, alongside his youkai friend Youko. An assignment leads Kantarou to a mountain where a shrine marks the place where the tengu had been sealed away. Calling upon the tengu by the name Haruka, Kantarou breaks the seal and becomes Haruka's master. As time goes on, Kantarou, Youko, and Haruka develop a close friendship. However, this relationship is threatened by Haruka's returning memories and his yearning to know more about his past.

Characters

 Kantarou is a young folklorist and part-time exorcist with an ability to see youkai. Kantarou is highly intelligent and is quite sneaky and manipulative. He is able to trick others into doing what he wants and anticipate their reactions. This trait has resulted in him being called a tactician by Haruka, hence the title of the series. Despite this, Kantarou has a good heart and feels deeply for youkai. Although it is customary for an exorcist to kill youkai, Kantarou chooses to reason with them and sees his line of work as a way to help them. His attitude has been criticized by both Haruka and Sugino, as they feel it may endanger him.

 Haruka is an oni-eating tengu, the strongest of all youkai. Kantarou, having named him, became his master and friend. Haruka has the ability to control lightning. Occasionally, such as when he is attacking oni, Haruka can transfigure into his true youkai form. His nails grow sharper and longer, his fangs grow longer, and his eyes constrict. Usually, he appears as a tall, dark-haired man with black wings that he can either hide or reveal. Haruka is troubled by his lack of memories, inability to eat youkai, and loss of power, which starts to affect his sense of self. Haruka's name under his previous master, an onmyōdō practitioner, was Rin. As Rin, he did not have a good relationship with his master, and it is hinted that she took advantage of his subservient status for sexual purposes.

 Youko is a female kitsune youkai whom Kantarou named. At the beginning of Tactics, Youko had already been living with Kantarou. She is loud and impulsive, and often loses her temper towards Kantaoru. Youko has the ability to make her fox ears appear and disappear at will, and can turn into her fox form if she wishes. Youko is shown to be deeply concerned about the household expenses and pesters Kantarou about finishing his book manuscripts. Before joining Kantarou, Youko was initially a lonely youkai who deceived travellers into thinking she was a member of their family. Youko pretends to be Kantarou's wife, but Kantarou soon reveals her to be a youkai, and invites her to join his household.

 Suzu is a rich teenage girl who constantly helps Katarou on his cases. She first met him in episode 1 and after that usually hangs out in his house. Suzu is often addressed as "Suzu-chan" and she maintains a very close relationship with Youko. She has a crush on Haruka, but often treats Kantarou harshly. Her character was created for the anime, but she has appeared in several of the manga's omake since.

 Sugino is a white tengu and the "god" of Sugino Village. As such, he is often called Sugino-sama. Unlike a black tengu, who is born a tengu, a white tengu is originally a powerful, overly-proud human priest or monk who changed into a tengu. Before Kantarou, Sugino had attempted to break Haruka's seal, but failed. Sugino has a great amount of dislike for the human race, having been a human himself. Sugino is married to Muu-chan, a small, green youkai. Upon being asked how they would reproduce, Sugino states that their relationship is platonic. Prior to meeting Muu-chan, Sugino was a cruel character who earned the nickname of 'violent tengu'. His cruelty caused him to be lonely and hate his immortality.

 Muu-chan is a small, green youkai who is married to Sugino and only says 'Muu'. Muu-chan has the ability to vacuum up demons and spells using its mouth.

 A handsome young wealthy nobleman, main opponent of series. He is the leader of the government's Demon Extermination Squad. He wants to make Kantarou cancel his name contract with Haruka so Haruka will get his memories back and become the "real" demon eating tengu he wishes to defeat. He hates that Kantarou was able to unseal the demon-eating tengu but he himself could not. He wields Minamoto's Legendary sword. His allies are Watanabe and Ibaragi.

Media

Manga
The manga was first released in North America by ADV Manga in 2004. Afterwards, the US license was transferred to Tokyopop, who released 8 volumes before they shut down their American branch. Volumes 1–12 were available on JManga until its closure in May 2013.

Volume list

Anime

Tactics originally aired in Japan on TV Tokyo from October 5, 2004, to March 29, 2005. The series consists of 25 episodes. The series was directed by Hiroshi Watanabe and was produced by Studio Deen. Tactics was licensed for English release and distributed by Manga Entertainment.

In the United States, it was featured on the Ani-Monday program from January 7, 2008, to April 21, 2008, on the Sci Fi Channel. Both were sung by Miki Akiyama.

Anime production staff
Director: Hiroshi Watanabe
Series composition: Kenichi Kanemaki
Dubbing director: Kazuhiko Inoue
Script: Kanemaki Kenichi
Screenplay: Hiroyuki Kawasaki, Katsuhiko Takayama, Masashi Kubota, Masashi Suzuki
Storyboard: Chiaki Ima, Hiroshi Watanabe, Masashi Kojima, Mitsuko Oyake, Shinpei Miyashita
Episode director: Chiaki Ima, Hiroshi Watanabe, Shigeru Ueda
Music: Kei Haneoka
Character design: Mariko Oka
Art director: Michiyo Akutsu
Chief animation director: Mariko Oka
Animation director: Minefumi Harada, Miyako Tsuji, Youichi Ishikawa, Yukiko Ban
Director of Photography: Akio Abe

Music
A CD for season 1 of the Tactics anime was released on June 27, 2006

Opening Theme
"Secret World"
Lyrics by: Yuriko Mori
Composition by: Kazuya Nishioka
Arrangement by: Kazuya Nishioka
Performed by: Miki Akiyama
Ending Theme

Lyrics by: Yuriko Mori
Composition by: Kazuya Nishioka
Arrangement by: Kazuya Nishioka
Performed by: Miki Akiyama

Light Novels
Three official light novels exist, all written by Nanami Nari, with the approval of Sakura Kinoshita and Kazuko Higashiyama. They have remained unlocalized, and do not possess English titles. They are published by Mag Garden Novels, a subsidiary of Mag Garden.

小説 tactics［天狗祭嫁取伝説異聞］（本文：七海鳴）
小説 tactics 第2巻［巷説妖狐残夢奇譚］（本文：七海鳴）
小説 tactics 第3巻［鬼種異界流離咒歌］（本文：七海鳴）

Dōjinshi
Kinoshita and Higashiyama form a dōjinshi circle called Mad Cookie Monster. They individually go by the pseudonyms Wasabi Katsuo and Wasabi Maguro, respectively.  This circle has released many dōjinshi for their own series, including Tactics, some of them containing explicit yaoi pornography. One of the rarest and best known of these titles is Love Sick, a 72-page dōjinshi containing an illustrated short novel and an explicit yaoi comic, featuring the pairing Haruka x Kantarou. Other dōjinshi based on Tactics are El Principe, which features mild Haruka x Kantarou, and Lil' Crazy, which features Raikou x Haruka.

References

Further reading

External links
 Official Tactics Manga Website 
 Tactics @ FrontierWorks 
 TV-Tokyo's Official Tactics Anime Website 
 

2001 manga
2004 anime television series debuts
ADV Manga
Exorcism in anime and manga
IG Port franchises
Japanese mythology in anime and manga
Mag Garden manga
Occult detective anime and manga
Odex
Shōjo manga
Shōnen manga
Studio Deen
TV Tokyo original programming
Tokyopop titles
Works about tengu
Yōkai in anime and manga